Aleksandra "Ola" Jordan (née Grabowska; born 30 September 1982) is a British-Polish professional ballroom dancer and model. She appeared as a professional on the British TV show Strictly Come Dancing from 2006 to 2015. After winning a championship event in her native Poland, Jordan moved to England and began a new partnership with James Jordan. They married on 12 October 2003 and live near Maidstone in Kent. In 2018, she became a judge on Dancing with the Stars: Taniec z gwiazdami in Poland.

Dancing career 
Jordan has been dancing since the age of twelve when her school advertised a dance club. Before dancing with James Jordan, she had danced with John Lowicki in Poland. She won Poland's Open Championships in 1999 and went on to take 12th place in the following year's World Championships.

The first recorded dance by Ola Grabowska and James Jordan as a partnership was in the Dutch Open in 2000,
 though they did not turn professional until 2003. The couple withdrew for a while to teach Latin American dancing in Hong Kong, though they turned professional again in 2005, after missing competing. In May 2006, the couple came second in the Blackpool Professional Rising Stars Latin event, and in November, they came third in the British Championships for Professional Latin.

Strictly Come Dancing

Highest and lowest scoring performances per dance

DJ Spoony is the only celebrity not to appear on this list.

Jordan first appeared on Strictly Come Dancing during the show's fourth series in 2006, partnering DJ Spoony. They were eliminated in the third round, a result which disappointed some of the audience. In series five she danced with Scottish rugby player Kenny Logan while her husband James danced with Kenny's wife, TV presenter Gabby Logan. Kenny was voted out of the show on the ninth week while Gabby Logan was voted out earlier, in the fourth week. Jordan was knocked out of series 6 in week seven of the competition, with her partner GMTV presenter Andrew Castle.
 
In January–February 2009 Jordan danced with Kenny Logan on the Strictly Come Dancing Tour and in series 7, she partnered reporter Chris Hollins, reaching the final and beating rivals Ricky Whittle and Natalie Lowe to become the 2009 champions. Their prize was a Strictly Come Dancing glitter ball. Jordan and Hollins became affectionately known as "Team Cola" by viewers and on the show, with Cola being a portmanteau of "Chris" and "Ola".

Jordan partnered magician Paul Daniels in the eighth season of the show; they were the second couple to be voted off. For Children in Need 2010, Jordan partnered Harry Judd from the band McFly for a one-off Strictly special, dancing a Paso Doble. The couple won, beating Rochelle Wiseman of The Saturdays and her partner Ian Waite.

In the ninth series of the show she was partnered with former Wales international footballer Robbie Savage. They were the ninth couple voted out on 4 December 2011.

In September 2012, during the show's tenth series, Jordan was partnered with EastEnders actor Sid Owen. The couple were eliminated on Halloween week in October 2012.

For the eleventh series in September 2013, Jordan competed with former Hollyoaks actor and singer Ashley Taylor Dawson. They got as far as the 11th week before being voted out.

In September 2014, for the show's twelfth series, Jordan was partnered with wildlife expert, presenter of the popular children's show Deadly 60 and its spinoffs, Steve Backshall. They were eliminated in week 9 (22/23 November 2014). On 7 October 2014, Jordan and Backshall appeared on BBC Radio 1's Innuendo Bingo.

On 5 September 2015, Strictly Come Dancing revealed Jordan would dance with sports commentator and Olympic medalist Iwan Thomas for the upcoming thirteenth series. They were the first couple to leave the competition on 4 October 2015. Shortly after their elimination Jordan announced this was to be her last series of Strictly Come Dancing as she would not be returning in the following series. She made her last appearance when she was featured in a group dance for the Series 13 Final.

DJ Spoony

Kenny Logan

Andrew Castle

Chris Hollins

 
Darcey Bussell joined the judging panel for the last 3 weeks of the show.

Paul Daniels

Robbie Savage

Sid Owen

Ashley Taylor Dawson

Steve Backshall

Donny Osmond joined the judging panel for Movie Week in Week 3.

Iwan Thomas

Other television appearances
Ola and James Jordan took part in a celebrity version of television programme Total Wipeout which was broadcast on 26 December 2009. She and Strictly Come Dancing head judge Len Goodman appeared as a team in the BBC programme Bargain Hunt in 2010 for the benefit of the Children in Need appeal. Ola and James Jordan also took part in the judging panel on the television show Dancing on Wheels in 2010, and the couple also appeared on All Star Mr & Mrs in 2013, where they won the show. Ola and James appeared on an episode of Through the Keyhole in September 2015, as celebrity homeowners.

In December 2014, Jordan was announced as one of the celebrity competitors for the Channel 4 series The Jump, a television show which requires celebrities to compete in events such as skeleton, ski jumping, bobsled, slalom, and ski cross. While practicing for the series, Jordan fell during a training run. The resulting injury forced Jordan to withdraw from The Jump and prevented her from participating in the Series 12 finale of Strictly Come Dancing. The fall caused Jordan to suffer a torn ligament in her knee, an injury which required Jordan to undergo surgery.

In November 2016, she took part in the sixteenth series of I'm a Celebrity...Get Me Out of Here!. She was the third celebrity to leave the show.

In February 2018, Polish broadcaster Polsat announced that Jordan would replace Beata Tyszkiewicz as a judge on Dancing with the Stars: Taniec z gwiazdami (Polish version of Strictly Come Dancing).

In 2019, she appeared on the fourth series of Celebrity Coach Trip alongside husband James.

References

External links
 James and Ola Jordan – Official website
 
 Strictly Come Dancing series four BBC Press Office, 29 September 2006

1982 births
Living people
People from Nasielsk
Polish ballroom dancers
Polish emigrants to the United Kingdom
Polish expatriates in the United Kingdom
Strictly Come Dancing winners
Polish female dancers
I'm a Celebrity...Get Me Out of Here! (British TV series) participants